Polyura posidonius is a butterfly in the family Nymphalidae. It was described by Leech in 1891. It is found in Tibet and western China.

References

External links
Polyura Billberg, 1820 at Markku Savela's Lepidoptera and Some Other Life Forms

Polyura
Butterflies described in 1894